Hot City is the debut album by  Gene Page. It was produced by Barry White.

Track listing
"All Our Dreams are Coming True"  (Gene Page)  4:00
"Jungle Eyes"  (Billy Page, Gene Page)  4:50
"She's My Main Squeeze" (Billy Page, Gene Page)  3:58
"Gene's Theme"  (Barry White)  3:28
"I am Living in a World of Gloom"  (Barry White, Carnell Harrell, Elbert Denny)  3:33
"Don't Play that Song" (Barry White)  4:25
"Satin Soul"  (Barry White)  4:23
"Cream Corner (Get What You Want)"  (Barry White, Gene Page)  3:44
"To The Bone" (Barry White, Gene Page)  4:36

Personnel
Gene Page  – keyboards, arranger, conductor
Wilton Felder – bass
Ed Greene – drums
Barry White, Clarence McDonald – keyboards
David T. Walker, Dean Parks, Melvin "Wah-Wah Watson" Ragin, Ray Parker Jr. – guitars
Ernie Watts – flute, soloist, saxophone, soloist
Joe Clayton – congas
Gary Coleman – congas

External links
 Gene Page-Hot City at Discogs

1974 debut albums
Gene Page albums
Albums arranged by Gene Page
Atlantic Records albums